In distributed computing, SSLIOP is an Internet Inter-ORB Protocol (IIOP) over Secure Sockets Layer (SSL), providing confidentiality and authentication.

, SSLIOP is implemented by (at least) TAO, JacORB, OpenORB , and MICO .

See also
 CSIv2
 SECIOP

Common Object Request Broker Architecture